The Welsh Harlequin is a breed of domestic duck originating in Wales. In 1949, in Criccieth, Group Captain Leslie Bonnet discovered a colour mutation among his flock of Khaki Campbells and began selective breeding for the trait. By 1968, hatching eggs were exported to the United States, followed by the importation of live birds in 1981.

Today, the Welsh Harlequin is a light-weight duck breed known for its vivid plumage and egg laying ability. Over the years the colour and conformation of the breed has changed, indicating that likely new blood of another breed has been introduced. Welsh Harlequins weigh 4.5 to 5.5 pounds (2-2.5 kilos). Females have a black bill and brown legs and feet, and their plumage is similar to a mallard but heavily frosted with white. They also lack the eye stripes of mallard females. Drakes are also similar to a heavily frosted Mallard with a yellow/green bill and orange legs and feet. There is also a color variation known as "golden", popular in the UK, which replaces the black feather pigments with a light golden brown color. Welsh Harlequins have a unique, natural sex-linked characteristic. As day olds, sex can be determined based on bill colour with over 90% accuracy. Young drakes will have darker bills while female with have lighter with a dark spot at the tip of the bill.

The birds produce a lean carcass and are active foragers, though they are sometimes more vulnerable to predators such as birds of prey due to their light colouration. The egg laying ability is highly valued as the production exhibited by some ducks rivals that of hens. The breed is prone to broodiness and a pair can easily produce young without human interference. They have become a popular backyard pet in recent years due to the bird's calm demeanor and high egg production.

The Welsh Harlequin was admitted to the American Poultry Association's Standard of Perfection in 2001. As of 2016 the Welsh Harlequin in North America has jumped from critical to watched by the American Livestock Breeds Conservancy.

See also
 List of duck breeds

References

 

Duck breeds
Conservation Priority Breeds of the Livestock Conservancy
Duck breeds originating in the United Kingdom
1949 introductions
Animal breeds on the RBST Watchlist